The Morning After may refer to:

Film
 The Morning After (1974 film), a television movie starring Dick Van Dyke
 The Morning After (1986 film), a  film starring Jane Fonda

Literature
 The Morning After (book), a 1993 book by Katie Roiphe

Music
 The Morning After (Deborah Cox album), a 2002 album by Deborah Cox
 "The Morning After" (1937 song), a 1937 song recorded by Tommy Dorsey and His Orchestra
 The Morning After (The J. Geils Band album), a 1971 album by the J. Geils Band
 The Morning After (James album), a 2010 album by James
 The Morning After (Maureen McGovern album), a 1973 album by Maureen McGovern
 "The Morning After" (Maureen McGovern song), a 1973 song by Maureen McGovern that was the theme song for The Poseidon Adventure
 The Morning After (Tankard album), a 1988 album by Tankard
 "Morning After", a 2006 song by Dead by Sunrise from Underworld: Evolution: Original Motion Picture Soundtrack
 "The Morning After", a 1989 song from Faith No More's The Real Thing
 "The Morning After", a 1984 song from Ratt's Round and Round single

Radio
 The Morning After (radio show), a program on Kerrang! Radio

Television
 "The Morning After" (The Avengers), a 1969 episode of The Avengers

Web series
 The Morning After (web series), a 2011 web series on Hulu

See also
 Morning-after pill